Petar Krivokuća (Serbian Cyrillic: Петар Кривокућа; born 12 June 1947) is a Serbian retired football defender who played for Yugoslavia.

Club career
Krivokuća made 13 Greek first division appearances for Iraklis Thessaloniki during the 1976–77 season.

International career
Krivokuća made his debut for Yugoslavia in a June 1972 Mini-Copa match against Venezuela and earned a total of 13 caps, scoring no goals. His final international was a June 1974 friendly match against England.

References

External links
 
 

1947 births
Living people
People from Ivanjica
Association football fullbacks
Yugoslav footballers
Yugoslavia international footballers
FK Javor Ivanjica players
FK Sloboda Užice players
Red Star Belgrade footballers
Iraklis Thessaloniki F.C. players
FC Rouen players
FK Obilić players
FK Voždovac players
Yugoslav First League players
Super League Greece players
Ligue 1 players
Yugoslav expatriate footballers
Expatriate footballers in Greece
Yugoslav expatriate sportspeople in Greece
Expatriate footballers in France
Yugoslav expatriate sportspeople in France